"Nadurveni vuglishta" is the fourth album by the Bulgarian rock band Hipodil, released on 25 November 1998 under the Riva Sound label, the band's fourth with the company. The name is a pun – in Bulgarian Nadurveni vuglishta means "Horny charcoal", but if written separately, as in Na durveni vuglishta, it will still sound like the first version, but the meaning will be quite different – "Roasted on charcoal".

The album was initially released on audio cassettes only and after a famous controversy (see below) was released also on a CD in 2003. Some of the tracks were included in the band's CD compilation Tu'pest in 1999.

Controversy 
Prior the album release, the lyrics of some tracks like "Poslednoto zemno izprazvane na kosmonavta Romanenko" (Cosmonaut Romanenko's Last Jerk-off on Earth), "Arividerci" and "Vurtianalen sex" (Virtuanal Sex) leaked to Bulgarian media and shocked part of the audience with their explicit, though humorous content.

Bulgarian Ministry of Culture, which by law regulates Bulgarian publishing industry, speedily [over]reacted and banned the release of the album on CD and was to file against the band in court for obscenity. Strangely, the ministry did not ban the audio cassette release of the album so it reached the market in that format.

Much to the amazement of both fans and media, the band chose not to fully exploit the marketing opportunities this controversy created and instead kept low profile. They only allowed themselves a few vague remarks on 'censorship', 'freedom of speech' and 'bigotry' during the promo party for the album in a downtown Sofia club. Bulgarian media speculated that the band and their label behaved like that due to inappropriate legal advice, which, if true, could be qualified as a major PR flop for the band.

Reportedly, ministry officials invited the band and representatives of their label to a meeting. No official information on the discussions held at this meeting was ever released to public but the ministry dropped its plans to sue the band.

As expected, the controversy helped the album become Hipodil's first real commercial success though no trustworthy sales figures were ever made available to public, a common practice in Bulgarian music industry even today. In 2003, the album was released on CD with no legal consequences neither for Hipodil nor for their label. The reissue had text saying "Zabraneniyat album!" ("Forbidden album!") over the Hipodil logo.

Music 
Musically, the album presents Hipodil as a mature though still restless and highly critical band with strong connections to punk, ska and heavy metal. The band demonstrated significant growth in both musical and lyrical direction and even though some hardcore fans criticized the album for being a bit far from the raw sound of the band's early recordings, Nadurveni vuglishta was obviously of higher production and historical value.

The pilot track "Bate Gojko" (mentioned here is the Yugoslavian actor Gojko Mitić, famous in the former Eastern Bloc for his East German-made western films in which he usually played a Native American protagonist) became Hipodil's most popular song. It entered Bulgarian airplay charts, another 'first ever' in the band's history, despite the tongue-in-cheek implications in the lyrics. It was among the few Hipodil tracks to have a video.

The next song from the album to have a video was "D'ska", which however failed to repeat "Bate Gojko"'s success. These two tracks sound more mainstream and ska-orientated than the other stuff in the record, which is basically harder and more aggressive. As usual, Hipodil make a lot of funny parodies and mockeries, targeted at other Bulgarian pop acts like Argirov Brothers, Marius Kurkinski and Irina Florin and their songs in "Tintiri-mintiri". The band also offers some serious lyrics in songs like "Potuvane nagore!" (Sinking Upward), "Otnesen!" (Scatter-brained) and "Vujen" (Rope) while "Nishto" (Nothing) is an openly depressive song.

When you read the first letter (B) of the English-titled song "Bless me" in Bulgarian (as "V") it sounds like the Bulgarian phrase Vlez mi ("Enter into me"). This phrase, as used in the chorus of the track, should not be taken literally as in Bulgarian slang it means an invitation to start a fight, another pun in the well-known style of Hipodil.

Tracks

Personnel 

 Svetoslav Vitkov – vocals
 Petar Todorov – guitars
 Ventzi Bassistcheto – bass guitar
 Lachezar Marinov -drums

External links
 Nadurveni vuglishta at Discogs (list of versions)

Hipodil albums
1998 albums